Nabil Maâloul (born 25 December 1962) is a Tunisian professional football manager and former player who is currently managing Espérance de Tunis.

Maâloul was capped 74 times for his country, and participated in 1988 Summer Olympics in Seoul. He spent most of his playing career with his home club, ES Tunis and won it a historic treble as a coach in 2011 (league, cup and CAF Champions League).

During his managerial career, he was in charge of three national teams: Tunisia, Kuwait, and Syria, but he also managed clubs in Tunisia and Qatar.

Club career
Maâloul began playing football at the age of 6 or 7, following the example of his father. He began his professional career at the ES Tunis at the age of 18 and then dropped his studies.

He then wore the colors of CA Bizertin during the return phase of the 1994–1995 season and then of Club Africain between 1995 and 1996, marking the end of his career, due to a disagreement with the president of the club Slim Chiboub, who does not want to sign a contract with him again after a short period in Saudi Arabia.

International career
With the National team he started in 1985, collecting 74 appearances in 10 years and scored 11 goals. He participated in the 1988 Summer Olympics in Seoul. He was one of the youngest captains in the national team's history at 23 years old.

Managerial career
He finished his playing career and became coach of Olympique du Kef in 1997. In 2002, he became assistant coach of Roger Lemerre when Tunisia won 2004 African Cup of Nations. He decided to leave his post as assistant for coaching Club Africain and in September 2006 he returned to the staff of the team. Meanwhile, he made a brief pass as coach of CA Bizertin at the start of the 2005–2006 season with unconvincing results.

The real start was in December 2010, he took command of Espérance de Tunis, following the dismissal of Maher Kanzari, and won with it a historic treble in 2011 (League, Cup and CAF Champions League) before being replaced by Michel Decastel in January 2012; He replaced it a few months later. On 14 February 2013, he officially became the coach of the Tunisia. On 23 March, he coached his first match with Sierra Leone and Tunisia wins by the score of (2–1). On 7 September, after a home defeat (0–2) with Cape Verde that eliminates Tunisia from qualifying for the 2014 World Cup, Maâloul announces his resignation. Cape Verde was later expunged from the qualification after the players' eligibility controversies.

On 29 November 2013, he agreed with Raja de Casablanca to become coach of the team in 2013 FIFA Club World Cup, replacing Mohamed Fakhir, before refusing.

On 20 January 2014, he became the coach of the Qatari team El Jaish SC, and won 2014 Qatar Crown Prince Cup on 26 April 2014. He also took the team from 5th to 2nd place in half a season therefore qualifying for the AFC Champions League.

On 20 December 2014, he became the coach of Kuwait, and coached them in 2015 AFC Asian Cup and the Second Round of 2018 FIFA World Cup qualification before that FIFA suspend Kuwait Football Association on 16 October 2015.

On 27 April 2017, Maâloul became the coach of Tunisia again and succeeded in bringing his team back to the 2018 FIFA World Cup for the first time since 2006 and becoming the second Tunisian coach to qualify for the World Cup after Abdelmajid Chetali in 1978. After the team's elimination from the group stage despite its honorable performance and winning Tunisia's second game ever in a World Cup against Panama, he resigned to coach Al-Duhail SC. He parted ways after six months of coaching due to multiple disagreements with the club.

On 11 March 2020, Maâloul was officially appointed as the new head coach of Syria on a one-year contract, to become the first Tunisian to coach Syria. Despite reaching the third round of the World Cup qualification, Maâloul resigned on 16 June 2021 due to unpaid salaries, after losing 3–1 to China.

On 27 October 2021, Maâloul became the coach of Kuwait SC. He has won the Emir Cup on 21 December 2021 and the Kuwait Premier League in April 2022.

On 9 June 2022, Maaloul returned to Espérance nearly 10 years after his departure.

Career statistics

Managerial

Honours

Player
Espérance de Tunis
Tunisian Ligue Professionnelle 1: 1982, 1985, 1988, 1989, 1993, 1994
Tunisian Cup: 1986, 1989
Tunisian Super Cup: 1993
Arab Club Championship: 1993
Club Africain
Tunisian Ligue Professionnelle 1: 1996
Arab Cup Winners' Cup: 1995

Manager
ES Tunis
Tunisian Ligue Professionnelle 1: 2011, 2012, 2022
Tunisian Cup: 2011
CAF Champions League: 2011
El Jaish
Qatar Cup: 2014
Kuwait SC
 Kuwait Premier League: 2022
 Kuwait Emir Cup:  2021

References

External links

1962 births
Living people
Tunisian Muslims
Tunisian footballers
Tunisian expatriate footballers
Footballers from Tunis
Espérance Sportive de Tunis players
Hannover 96 players
CA Bizertin players
Club Africain players
Al-Ahli Saudi FC players
2. Bundesliga players
Tunisian Ligue Professionnelle 1 players
Saudi Professional League players
Tunisia national football team managers
Club Africain football managers
Club Athlétique Bizertin managers
Espérance Sportive de Tunis managers
El Jaish SC managers
Kuwait national football team managers
Expatriate football managers in Germany
Expatriate football managers in Kuwait
Expatriate football managers in Qatar
Expatriate football managers in Syria
Tunisian expatriate sportspeople in Saudi Arabia
Tunisian expatriate sportspeople in Germany
Tunisian expatriate sportspeople in Kuwait
Tunisian expatriate sportspeople in Qatar
2015 AFC Asian Cup managers
2018 FIFA World Cup managers
Al-Duhail SC managers
Association football midfielders
Tunisian football managers
Syria national football team managers
Tunisia international footballers
Tunisian expatriate football managers
Kuwait SC managers
Kuwait Premier League managers
Tunisian expatriate sportspeople in Syria